WHMZ-LP (95.5 FM) was a licensed low-power radio station in Madison, Alabama. The station was owned by Madison County Citizens for Better Government.

The station was granted a construction permit on February 20, 2014; the WHMZ-LP call sign was issued on March 20, 2014. WHMZ-LP filed for a license to cover the permit on July 6, 2015, and was granted it on July 13.

WHMZ-LP's license was cancelled by the Federal Communications Commission on April 2, 2020, due to the station failing to file an application for license renewal by April 1.

References

External links

HMZ-LP
Radio stations established in 2015
2015 establishments in Alabama
Madison County, Alabama
Defunct radio stations in the United States
Radio stations disestablished in 2020
2020 disestablishments in Alabama
HMZ-LP